NLW may refer to:

 National League West
 National Library of Wales
 Newton-le-Willows railway station, England; National Rail station code NLW
 Non-lethal weapon
 Alias of a Dutch electronic music producer and Disc Jockey Afrojack